is the twentieth single by Japanese rock band Luna Sea, released on May 29, 2019. It is their second double A-side single and reached number 7 on the Oricon chart and number 20 on Billboards Japan Hot 100.

Overview
Both songs were used as opening themes for the Mobile Suit Gundam: The Origin - Advent of the Red Comet anime; "Sora no Uta ~Higher and Higher~" was used from episode one until episode four, and "Hisōbi" was used from episode five until episode eight. A fan of the Gundam franchise since childhood, lead guitarist Sugizo was in charge of all of the anime's theme songs.

The music video for "Sora no Uta ~Higher and Higher~" utilizes footage from the anime as its lyrics feature connections to the fictional world of Gundam. A different music video for the song using footage of the band performing it live at the Nippon Budokan was also released. The music video for "Hisōbi" features the band performing the ballad in sand dunes with footage shot via a drone by a Japanese drone racing champion.

Release
The single was released in three editions; a regular edition, a Limited Edition A and a Limited Edition B, each of which features a different cover. The covers of the latter two were illustrated by Yoshikazu Yasuhiko; Limited Edition A features characters from Mobile Suit Gundam: The Origin, while Limited Edition B features the members of Luna Sea. Two additional versions of the limited editions were sold exclusively via the Universal Music Store and include a T-shirt of their cover illustrations, with Limited Edition A also including a DVD of the music video for "Sora no Uta ~Higher and Higher~".

Track listing
All songs written and composed by Luna Sea.
 - 5:07Originally composed by Sugizo.
 - 4:43Originally composed by Sugizo.

References

2019 singles
2019 songs
Luna Sea songs
Gundam songs
Japanese-language songs
Universal Music Group singles